Elysius sebrus is a moth of the family Erebidae. It was described by Herbert Druce in 1899. It is found in Brazil and Bolivia.

References

 

sebrus
Moths described in 1899
Moths of South America